People Are Funny is a 1946 American musical comedy film directed by Sam White based on the popular radio show of the same name.

Plot summary 
Radio producer John Guedel is panicked and dumbfounded when his popular radio show Humbug is immediately taken off the air for making fun of the legal profession.  Given a deadline to produce a replacement, Gudel contacts his writer girlfriend Corey Sullivan to help him but Corey has another client, Leroy Brinker seeking a radio show for himself. The two come across a radio show put on in a small town called People Are Funny that mixes bizarre challenges to contestants with musical entertainment.  Corey gets the show's producer Pinky Wilson to bring his show to Mr Guedel.

Cast 
Jack Haley as Pinky Wilson
Helen Walker as Corey Sullivan
Rudy Vallee as Ormsby Jamison
Ozzie Nelson as Leroy Brinker
Phillip Reed as John Guedel
Bob Graham as Luke
Roy Atwell as Mr. Pippensigal
Barbara Roche as Aimee
Clara Blandick as Grandma
Art Linkletter as Master of Ceremonies
Frances Langford as Frances Langford
Byron Foulger as Mr. Button (uncredited)

Production
Pine Thomas bought the screen rights to the radio show in 1944. Jack Haley who signed a two-picture deal with Pine Thomas was assigned to star.

Soundtrack 
 Frances Langford with chorus -"I'm in the Mood for Love" (by Jimmy McHugh and Dorothy Fields (lyrics))
 Bob Graham - "Every Hour on the Hour" (by Duke Ellington and Don George)
 Jack Haley with chorus - "Hey Jose" (by Pepe Guízar and Tito Guízar, English lyrics by Jay Livingston and Ray Evans)
 The Vagabonds (in blackface) - "Angelina" (by Allan Roberts and Doris Fisher)
 The Vagabonds - "The Old Squaredance is Back Again" (by Don Reid and Harry Tobias)
 Rudy Vallee with Ozzie Nelson and others - "Alouette" (traditional French Folksong, orchestrated and English lyrics by Rudy Vallee)
 The Vagabonds (in drag)- "Chuck a Luckin'" (by Archie Gottler and Jay Milton and Walter G. Samuels)
 Rosarita Varela - "Celito Lindo"

References

External links 
 
 
 
 

1946 films
1946 musical comedy films
Films based on radio series
American musical comedy films
American black-and-white films
Paramount Pictures films
Films directed by Sam White (film producer)
1940s English-language films
1940s American films